Otey may refer to:

People
 Alex Otey (born 1959), American singer-songwriter
 Bill Otey (1886–1931), American pitcher
 Harold Lamont Otey (1951–1994), American murderer
 James Hervey Otey (1800–1863), American Episcopal bishop
 Kirkwood Otey (1832–1897), American commanding officer of the 11th Virginia Infantry
 Louis Otey (born 1954), American baritone singer
 Orlando Otey (1925–2011), Mexican-born pianist
 Peter J. Otey (1840–1902), American Confederate States Army officer
 Otey Cannon (born 1950), American former soccer forward
 Otey Clark (1915–2010), American Major League Baseball pitcher

Places
 Otey, Texas, an unincorporated community
 William Madison Otey House, a historic residence in Alabama

See also
 Otay (disambiguation)